Nicaragua first participated at the Olympic Games in 1968, and has sent athletes to compete in every Summer Olympic Games since then, except the 1988 Games which they did not attend due to athletic and financial considerations.   The nation has never participated in the Winter Olympic Games.

To date, no athletes from Nicaragua have won an Olympic medal, although the baseball team finished in fourth place at the 1996 Summer Olympics.

The National Olympic Committee for Nicaragua was created in 1959 and recognized by the International Olympic Committee that same year.

Medal tables

Medals by Summer Games 

!Games
!Athletes
|style="background:gold; width:3.7em; font-weight:bold;"|Gold
|style="background:silver; width:3.7em; font-weight:bold;"|Silver
|style="background:#cc9966; width:3.7em; font-weight:bold;"|Bronze
!style="width:4em; font-weight:bold;"|Total
!style="width:4em; font-weight:bold;"|Rank
|-
|align=left|  || 11 || 0 || 0 || 0 || 0 || -
|-
|align=left|  || 8 || 0 || 0 || 0 || 0 || -
|-
|align=left|  || 15 || 0 || 0 || 0 || 0 || -
|-
|align=left|  || 5 || 0 || 0 || 0 || 0 || -
|-
|align=left|  || 5 || 0 || 0 || 0 || 0 || -
|-
|align=left|  || colspan=6| did not participate
|-
|align=left|  || 8 || 0 || 0 || 0 || 0 || -
|-
|align=left|  || 26 || 0 || 0 || 0 || 0 || -
|-
|align=left|  || 6 || 0 || 0 || 0 || 0 || -
|-
|align=left|  || 5 || 0 || 0 || 0 || 0 || -
|-
|align=left|  || 5 || 0 || 0 || 0 || 0 || -
|-
|align=left|  || 6 || 0 || 0 || 0 || 0 || -
|-
|align=left|  || 5 || 0 || 0 || 0 || 0 || -
|-
|align=left|  || 8 || 0 || 0 || 0 || 0 || -
|-
|align=left|  || colspan=6; rowspan=3| future event
|-
|align=left|  
|-
|align=left|  
|-
!colspan=2| Total !! 0 !! 0 !! 0 !! 0 !! -
|}

See also
 List of flag bearers for Nicaragua at the Olympics
 :Category:Olympic competitors for Nicaragua
 Nicaragua at the Paralympics

References

External links